Damzoussi may refer to:

Damzoussi, Saponé
Damzoussi, Toece